The Hornet's Nest: A Novel of the Revolutionary War is a 2003 novel by Jimmy Carter. It features the American Revolutionary War as fought in the Deep South, and is the first fictional publication by any president of the United States.

References

2003 novels
Novels set during the American Revolutionary War
Books by Jimmy Carter
Works about the American Revolution
Books written by presidents of the United States